The 1964 Far East Circuit was the third season of golf tournaments that comprised the Far East Circuit, later known as the Asia Golf Circuit.

Hsieh Yung-yo of Taiwan was the overall circuit champion.

Schedule
The table below shows the 1964 Far East Circuit schedule. There were two changes from the previous season, with the addition of the Capitol Hills Open in the Philippines and the withdrawal of the Yomiuri International from the circuit due to scheduling issues, which meant the circuit remained at five tournaments.

Final standings
The Far East Circuit standings were based on a points system.

References

Far East Circuit
Asia Golf Circuit